Pincus or Pinkus may refer to:

Persons
Pincus (surname)
Pincus Green (born 1936), American businessman
Pincus Leff (1907–1983), American comedian 
Pincus Rutenberg (1879–1942), Russian engineer

Other uses
Hoagland-Pincus Conference Center, University of Massachusetts
Fibroepithelioma of Pinkus, a form of basal-cell carcinoma
Pincus Building, Alabama
Pinkus Müller, a German brewery
Warburg Pincus, an American private equity firm